"Down on My Knees" is a song written by Beth Nielsen Chapman and recorded by American country music artist Trisha Yearwood. It was released in June 1993 as the fourth single from the album Hearts in Armor.  The song reached number 19 on the Billboard Hot Country Singles & Tracks chart.

Content
The narrator, a secure and strong woman, describes how she would unabashedly beg on her knees for her lover to stay if he chose to leave her.

Music video
The music video was directed by Gerry Wenner and premiered in mid-1993. It was filmed in Los Angeles, California.

Chart performance
"Down on My Knees" debuted at number 70 on the U.S. Billboard Hot Country Singles & Tracks for the week of June 12, 1993.

References

1993 singles
Trisha Yearwood songs
Songs written by Beth Nielsen Chapman
Song recordings produced by Garth Fundis
MCA Records singles
1993 songs